Route 57 is a  east–west Massachusetts state route that runs from Monterey to Agawam.  The eastern 5.0 miles (8.1 km) in Agawam is a freeway that runs from Route 187 to the route's eastern terminus at U.S. Route 5.

Route description 

The route begins in Monterey, at its intersection with routes 23 and 183.   The section from there to New Marlborough (which is a concurrency with Route 183) primarily takes a southeastern path that passes several stretches of farmland.  In New Marlborough, Route 57 splits from Route 183 and follows a mainly easterly route with frequent curves, passing more farmland.  During this stretch, there is a brief concurrency with Route 8 in Sandisfield to cross the Farmington River's west branch.

In Southwick, Route 57 starts to enter a more suburban area.  There are more concurrencies during this stretch, first with U.S. Route 202 and Massachusetts Route 10 in Southwick, and then with Route 187 in Agawam.

When Route 57 splits off from Route 187, it becomes a freeway, the Henry E. Bodurtha Highway.  It has five exits before terminating in a rotary that is served by an interchange from U.S. Route 5.

History

Route 57 (which was formed by 1930) initially went from Southwick to West Springfield.  It was extended to Sandisfield in the mid-1930s and Monterey in the late 1940s.

Construction on the freeway portion began in 1958, with the first portion (to today's Route 159, then called Route 5A) opening in 1961.  It was extended to past Route 75 in 1966, with Route 57 being moved to the freeway around this time (the old alignment became Route 147).  In 1991, work to extend the freeway to Route 187 began, with the new section opening in 1995.  A further extension to Southwick has been proposed, but it was put on hold by then-Governor Mitt Romney in June 2005; nevertheless, Agawam's city council continues to urge the state to construct the extension. The MA 57 freeway exits do not have numbers.

Major intersections

References

External links

 MA Route 57 Historic Overview
 MA 57 Current and Speculative Future Exit Numbers List

057